The 1962 season was the Minnesota Vikings' second in the National Football League. Under head coach Norm Van Brocklin, the team finished with a 2–11–1 record that still stands as the franchise's worst season record in terms of winning percentage, both by today's method of calculation (.179) and the method used at the time (.154), in which ties were not counted as games played. The Vikings have won at least three games in every season since.

Offseason

1962 Draft

 The Vikings traded their 1st-round selection (2nd overall) to the New York Giants in exchange for QB George Shaw.
 The Vikings traded their 2nd-round selection (17th overall) and 11th-round selection (142nd overall) to Cleveland for DT Jim Prestel, DE Jim Marshall, LB Dick Grecni, RB Jamie Caleb, RB Billy Gault and DT Paul Dickson.
 The Vikings traded their 5th-round selection (58th overall) to the New York Giants for RB Mel Triplett, TE Bob Schnelker and OT Bob Schmidt.
 The Vikings traded their 7th-round selection (86th overall) to Philadelphia for TE Jerry Reichow.
 The Vikings traded their 10th-round selection (129th overall) to Cleveland for DE Bob Denton.

Roster

Preseason

Regular season

Schedule

Note: Intra-conference opponents are in bold text.

Standings

Pro Bowl
Second-year halfback Tommy Mason was the only Viking voted to the East–West Pro Bowl game, played January 13, 1963, at the Los Angeles Memorial Coliseum and won by the East 30–20.

Statistics

Team leaders

League rankings

References

Minnesota Vikings seasons
Minnesota
Minnesota Vikings